John Dawson Eccles, 2nd Viscount Eccles,  (born 20 April 1931), is a British Conservative peer and businessman. He is one of the ninety hereditary peers elected to remain in the House of Lords after the passing of the House of Lords Act 1999.

Background and education
The son of the 1st Viscount Eccles and Sybil Dawson, he was educated at Winchester College and Magdalen College, Oxford, where he graduated with a Bachelor of Arts in philosophy, politics and economics in 1954. He served in the 1st Battalion (60th Rifles), King's Royal Rifle Corps, reaching the rank of 2nd Lieutenant.

Political career
In 1985, he was appointed a Commander of the Order of the British Empire (CBE); and since 1989 a DSc (Silsoe). On 24 February 1999, he entered his inheritance. Lord Eccles entered the House of Lords upon its reform; however, due to the House of Lords Act, he was soon obliged to vacate his position in the House. He was later invited to election as one of the 92 remaining hereditary peers in a by-election forced by the death of the 4th Baron Aberdare, and returned to the House in 2005.

Directorships and similar
The Nuclear Power Group: director from 1968 to 1974
Head Wrightson & Co Ltd: managing director from 1968 to 1977, chairman from 1976 to 1977
Glynwed International plc: director from 1972 to 1996
Investors in Industry plc: director from 1974 to 1988
Monopolies and Mergers Commission: member from 1976 to 1986, deputy chairman from 1981 to 1985
Davy International Ltd: director from 1977 to 1981
Chamberlin & Hill plc: chairman from 1982 to 2004
Industrial Development Advisory Board: member from 1989 to 1993
Acker Deboeck corporate psychologists: chairman from 1994 to 2004
Commonwealth Development Corporation: member from 1982 to 1985, general manager and chief executive from 1985 to 1994.
Courtaulds Textiles plc: director from 1992 to 2000, chairman from 1995 to 2000
Bowes Museum Trust: chairman from 2000

Family
Lord Eccles married Diana Catherine Sturge 29 January 1955, in Bletchingley, Surrey. They have four children:

 Hon. Alice Belinda Eccles (born 1958)
 Hon. William David Eccles (born 1960)
 Hon. Catherine Sara Eccles (born 1963)
 Hon. Emily Frances Eccles (born 1970)

Viscountess Eccles was created a life peer in her own right in 1990 as Baroness Eccles of Moulton, and so also sits in the House of Lords. They are one of the few couples who both hold peerages in their own right.

Arms

References

External links

1931 births
Commanders of the Order of the British Empire
King's Royal Rifle Corps officers
Living people
Viscounts in the Peerage of the United Kingdom
Alumni of Magdalen College, Oxford
People educated at Winchester College
People from Richmondshire (district)
Conservative Party (UK) hereditary peers
Spouses of life peers
Eccles
Eccles